Kyotto is a Sri Lankan DJ and music producer. 

He cites Marshall Jefferson and Shakin' Stevens among his influences.

Discography

Singles & EPs
"Antimony/Sweet Escape", Dopamine White, 2020
"White Lights" , Soundteller Records, 2020

References

Progressive house musicians
Sri Lankan DJs
Living people
Year of birth missing (living people)